Stanislav Afanasievich Petukhov (born August 19, 1937 in Moscow, Soviet Union) is a Russian retired ice hockey player who played for HC Dynamo Moscow in the Soviet Hockey League. He was inducted into the Russian and Soviet Hockey Hall of Fame in 1963.

External links
 Russian and Soviet Hockey Hall of Fame bio

References 

1937 births
Living people
HC Dynamo Moscow players
Ice hockey players at the 1960 Winter Olympics
Ice hockey players at the 1964 Winter Olympics
Ice hockey people from Moscow
Russian ice hockey players
Olympic medalists in ice hockey
Medalists at the 1960 Winter Olympics
Medalists at the 1964 Winter Olympics
Olympic ice hockey players of the Soviet Union
Olympic bronze medalists for the Soviet Union
Olympic gold medalists for the Soviet Union